Doppelter Einsatz is a German television series. This classic series starred Despina Pajanou as one of the two titular female, Hamburg police officers. Her partner changed over the seasons.

See also
List of German television series

References

External links
 
 Doppelter Einsatz - official RTL page

German crime television series
1990s German police procedural television series
2000s German police procedural television series
1994 German television series debuts
2007 German television series endings
Television shows set in Hamburg
German-language television shows
RTL (German TV channel) original programming